Anchor Bay School District is a school district in Michigan, serving portions of southern St. Clair and northeastern Macomb Counties.

District headquarters are located in Casco Township (St. Clair County).

The schools are accredited by the North Central Association.

Schools

Elementary schools
 Ashley http://www.anchorbay.misd.net/schools/ashley/
 Francois Maconce http://www.anchorbay.misd.net/schools/maconce/
 Great Oaks http://www.anchorbay.misd.net/schools/oaks/
 Lighthouse http://www.anchorbay.misd.net/schools/lighthouse/
 Lottie M. Schmidt http://www.anchorbay.misd.net/schools/lottie/
 MacDonald http://www.anchorbay.misd.net/schools/macdonald/
 Dean A. Naldrett http://www.anchorbay.misd.net/schools/naldrett/
 Sugarbush http://www.anchorbay.misd.net/schools/sugarbush/

Middle schools
Anchor Bay Middle School North (The Sailors)
Anchor Bay Middle School South (The Pirates)

High school
Anchor Bay High School (The Tars)

Other Facilities
 Bloom Academy 
 Early Childhood Center 
 Aquatic Center 
 Compass Pointe

References

External links
Official Website

School districts in Michigan
Education in St. Clair County, Michigan
Education in Macomb County, Michigan